Jackson Township is one of fifteen townships in Wayne County, Indiana, United States. As of the 2010 census, its population was 4,660 and it contained 2,136 housing units.

History
Jackson Township was organized in 1817.

Geography
Lakes in this township include Hi-Way Springs. The streams of Auburn Brook, Coon Creek, Crietz Creek, Horn Creek, Lick Branch, Pinhook Drain, Pronghorn Run, Springs Run and Symonds Creek run through this township.

Cities and towns
 Cambridge City
 Dublin
 East Germantown
 Mount Auburn

Unincorporated towns
 Hiser at 
 Pennville at 
(This list is based on USGS data and may include former settlements.)

Adjacent townships
 Jefferson Township (north)
 Center Township (east)
 Harrison Township (east)
 Washington Township (southeast)
 Posey Township, Fayette County (southwest)
 Dudley Township, Henry County (west)
 Liberty Township, Henry County (northwest)

Cemeteries
The township contains four cemeteries: Capitol Hill, East, Riverside and South Lawn.

Major highways
 Interstate 70
 U.S. Route 40
 State Road 1

References
 
 United States Census Bureau cartographic boundary files

External links
 Indiana Township Association
 United Township Association of Indiana

Townships in Wayne County, Indiana
Townships in Indiana